Raitis Grafs (born June 12, 1981) is a Latvian professional basketball center. Born in Riga, Latvia, he is a member of the Latvia national basketball team.

In kindergarten, Grafs met Kristaps Valters and they became fast friends. Since then, the two have grown to be best friends and teammates on the Latvia national basketball team. As a teenager, Grafs was regarded as one of the best prospects in Europe averaging 13.8 points and 10.5 rebounds at the 1998 U18 European Championship. He posted similar numbers (11.9 ppg and 11.0 rpg) at the 1999 World Junior Championship during which he was voted a First Team All-Star. At 16 years 5 months, Grafs became the youngest Latvian National Team member. For the next step in his career he chose to study at Valparaiso University; during four years at Valparaiso University (NCAA) he was nominated newcomer of the year in the conference. 
After university he returned to Europe and played in Belgium, Poland, Lithuania, Slovakia, Estonia, Cyprus and Latvia.

References

1981 births
Living people
Apollon Limassol BC players
ASK Riga players
BC Rakvere Tarvas players
BC Valga players
BK VEF Rīga players
BK Ventspils players
Centers (basketball)
Latvian expatriate basketball people in Estonia
Latvian men's basketball players
Latvian expatriate basketball people in the United States
Basketball players from Riga
Valparaiso Beacons men's basketball players